Bolivar G. Gill (August 1821March 8, 1907) was an American lumber merchant and Democratic politician.  He represented Ozaukee County in the Wisconsin State Senate in the 8th and 9th legislatures (1855 & 1856).  He later served on the Chicago City Council.  In historical documents his name is frequently abbreviated as B. G. Gill.

Biography
Bolivar G. Gill was born in New York.  He moved to Wisconsin Territory sometime before 1848 and became involved with the Whig Party in Dodge County.  He subsequently moved to Grafton, Wisconsin, where he became involved with railroad development.

While living in Ozaukee County, in 1854, he ran for Wisconsin State Senate as a Democrat, and was elected to the 8th Wisconsin Legislature.  After his term in the Legislature, Gill was one of dozens of lawmakers accused of accepting bribes from railroad companies and asked to stand down from any future electoral office.

In 1858, before the report of the bribery investigation was published, Gill moved to Chicago.  He became a prominent lumber merchant and changed his political affiliation again, becoming a member of the Republican Party.  In 1869 he was elected to the Chicago City Council, where he found himself on the other side of a corruption investigation.

He remained active in Republican Party politics but did not hold office again.  He was a presidential elector for Illinois in the disputed 1876 United States presidential election.

His business in the lumber industry continued until 1885, when he retired.

Personal life and family
Bolivar Gill and his wife Sera had no biological children, but adopted Eva Viola Keene after the death of her father.  Bolivar Gill died at his residence in River Forest, Illinois, on March 8, 1907.

References

External links
 

1821 births
1907 deaths
People from New York (state)
People from Ozaukee County, Wisconsin
Wisconsin state senators
Chicago City Council members
19th-century American politicians
Wisconsin Whigs
Wisconsin Democrats
Illinois Republicans